Pearl Island, formerly known as  in Chinese, is a small island southeast of Tuen Mun in Hong Kong.

Administration
Pearl Island is located in Sam Shing constituency of the Tuen Mun District Council. It was formerly represented by Michael Mo Kwan-tai, who was elected in the 2019 elections until July 2021.

Features
There are villa-type housing on the island and a road is connecting the island to the mainland. It is now part of the Gold Coast residential area in Hong Kong.

See also

 List of islands and peninsulas of Hong Kong

References

Islands of Hong Kong
Populated places in Hong Kong